Eagle Peak, is a  mountain summit located in Glacier National Park in the Selkirk Mountains in British Columbia, Canada. Its nearest higher peak is Uto Peak,  to the east. The Avalanche Glacier is situated on the northeast side of the peak. The peak is visible from eastbound Highway 1, the Trans-Canada Highway approaching Rogers Pass.

History

Eagle Peak was named by Harry Perley, the manager of the Glacier House hotel, for a crag on the west ridge that appears like the head of an eagle.

The first ascent of the mountain was made in 1893 by Samuel Allen and Walter Wilcox. Wilcox wrote of the climb in his 1896 book "Camping in the Canadian Rockies": "The name of the mountain is derived from a great crag or cliff near the summit, which appears to lean out from a ridge, and bears a striking resemblance to the head of an eagle. When we were making our ascent we came suddenly on the Eagle itself, which now, on a nearer view, proved to be of colossal size, a great leaning tower, about sixty feet high. Rising from one of the rocky ridges, it reached upwards and outwards till the outermost point seemed to overhang a bottomless abyss, perhaps twenty or twenty-five feet beyond the verge of the precipice. The ridge just below the summit is a scene of wild confusion, for the rocky ledges have been split up and wedged apart by frost and storms till they appear as giant blocks of stone ten or fifteen feet high, between the crevices of which one may catch glimpses of the valley and forests thousands of feet below. The view from the summit of Eagle Peak is magnificent and well worth the labor of the climb."

The mountain's name was officially adopted in 1932 when approved by the Geographical Names Board of Canada.

Climate

Based on the Köppen climate classification, Eagle Peak has a subarctic climate with cold, snowy winters, and mild summers.

See also

Geography of British Columbia

References

Two-thousanders of British Columbia
Selkirk Mountains
Glacier National Park (Canada)
Kootenay Land District